Naria helvola, common name: the honey cowry,  is a species of sea snail, a cowry, a marine gastropod mollusk in the family Cypraeidae, the cowries.

There are three subspecies:
Naria helvola bellatrix (Lorenz, 2009)
Naria helvola hawaiiensis (Melvill, 1888)
Naria helvola helvola (Linnaeus, 1758)
 Naria helvola meridionalis (Schilder & Schilder, 1938): synonym of Naria helvola helvola (Linnaeus, 1758)
Naria helvola var. callista (Shaw, 1909): synonym of Naria helvola helvola (Linnaeus, 1758)

Description
The basic color of the shell is orange-brown or beige, with many white dots on the top of the dorsum. The underside is orange-brown. In the living cowries the mantle is transparent, with short white papillae.

Distribution
This species occurs throughout the Indo-Pacific, along the Red Sea, Aldabra, Chagos, the Comores, the East Coast of South Africa, Kenya, Madagascar, the Mascarene Basin, Mauritius, Mozambique, Réunion, the Seychelles, Somalia,  Tanzania, Polynesia and Hawaii.

Habitat
Naria helvola lives in intertidal and shallow subtidal waters or in lagoons, usually hiding during the day under the rocks of the reef.

References
Notes

 Verdcourt, B. (1954). The cowries of the East African Coast (Kenya, Tanganyika, Zanzibar and Pemba). Journal of the East Africa Natural History Society 22(4) 96: 129-144, 17 pls.
 Burgess, C.M. (1970). The Living Cowries. AS Barnes and Co, Ltd. Cranbury, New Jersey
 Branch, G.M. et al. (2002). Two Oceans. 5th impression. David Philip, Cate Town & Johannesburg
 Lorenz, F. (2017). Cowries. A guide to the gastropod family Cypraeidae. Volume 1, Biology and systematics. Harxheim: ConchBooks. 644 pp.

External links
 Linnaeus, C. (1758). Systema Naturae per regna tria naturae, secundum classes, ordines, genera, species, cum characteribus, differentiis, synonymis, locis. Editio decima, reformata (10th revised edition), vol. 1: 824 pp. Laurentius Salvius: Holmiae
 Gastropods.com : Naria helvola helvola; accessed: 6 January 2019
 Underwater

Cypraeidae
Gastropods described in 1758
Taxa named by Carl Linnaeus